Vladimir Petrovich Sandrkin (born 7 June 1992) is a former Russian football striker.

Club career
He made his Russian Football National League debut for FC Mordovia Saransk on 24 June 2011 in a game against FC Alania Vladikavkaz.

References

External links
 
 
 Profile by Sportbox.ru

1992 births
Living people
Russian footballers
Association football forwards
FC Mordovia Saransk players
FC Energiya Volzhsky players